The Montana State University Archives and Special Collections, also known as the Merrill G. Burlingame Archives and Special Collections, is located in Bozeman, Montana. The archives is on the second floor of the Renne Library on the Montana State University-Bozeman campus and consists of materials relating to the history of the American West, trout and salmonids, the Greater Yellowstone Ecosystem and other topics.

About 

The Merrill G. Burlingame Special Collections is located in the Montana State University Library in Bozeman, Montana. Merrill G. Burlingame and Minnie Paugh were instrumental to the creation and development of the archive, establishing a solid foundation of research and collection of regionally important materials. Minnie Paugh (1919–2003) was a reference librarian and instructor at Montana State College (now Montana State University), where she helped establish the university's Archives and Special Collections. She was a prolific researcher and writer, contributing to several Montana history books. Paugh also generated a collection of oral histories, consisting of notes, tapes, interviews, photographs, and historical ephemera. Her interests included indigenous tribes of the North American West, particularly those in Montana, Yellowstone National Park, and the agricultural and ranching history of Montana. Paugh made significant contributions to the area of Montana history, the development of Montana State University's Archives and Special Collections, and the creation of an extensive Montana oral history collection held at Montana State University. Paugh's work is housed at the Montana State University Archives and Special Collections, including books, unpublished materials, and family histories. In addition to her own materials, the Merrill G. Burlingame Archives and Special Collections contains many collections that Paugh personally worked on and contributed to. Similarly, Merrill G. Burlingame (1901–1994) was a prolific researcher and historian who published numerous works essential to the development of the archive. Burlingame was a history professor at Montana State College and an active member in the creation of the Museum of the Rockies. These included journal publications and books on topics such as politics in Montana, the military in Montana, and general history of the American West.

The areas of collection at the MSU Archives and Special Collections include but are not limited to Montana history, notable residents of Montana, Native American history, and environmental and agricultural history. The materials are divided into 11 broad areas of collection.

 Farm, Ranch Management, and Agriculture
 Architecture and Engineering 
 Histories of Montana and the American West 
 Native Americans 
 Montana State University History 
 The People of Montana 
 Trout, Salmonids, and Angling History 
 Politics and Government 
 Yellowstone National Park and the Greater Yellowstone Ecosystem 
 Women's and Gender Histories 
 Regional Writers and Narratives

The Montana State Archives and Special Collections consists of 34,000 volumes and 1200 linear feet of manuscript materials. There are also video and sound recordings, microforms, newspapers, maps, and photographs pertaining to the above areas of collection. In addition to physical holdings, the archive also produces and manages digital collections, which include the complete digitization of the Ivan Doig Archive, the Montanan Yearbooks collection, and the 1972 Montana Constitutional Convention Oral History collection.

Notable collections 
There are numerous collections of note held at the Montana State Archives and Special Collections, including collections on Yellowstone National Park, environmental history and ecology of the North American West, Native Americans, Western writers, and more.

 Trout and Salmonid Collection
 Jack Ellis Haynes and Haynes Inc. Records
 F. Jay Haynes Papers
 Ivan Doig Archive
 Burton K. Wheeler Papers
 Fort Ellis and Gustavus C. Doane Collection
 Yellowstone Park Company Records
 Mildred J. Leigh Papers
 Marian T. Place Papers
 James Willard Schultz Papers

References

Further reading 

 "MSU, Montana Free Press to mark Constitutional Convention's 50th anniversary." Bozeman Daily Chronicle, March 15, 2022.
 Burlingame, Merrill G. Political Divisions in Montana. (1974, Bozeman, Montana).
 "John Heminway: American Master of Dramatic Earthly Storytelling." Mountain Journal, June 15, 2021. 
 "MSU Library Adds Ian van Coller books to Special Collections." MSU News and University Communications, October 8, 2020.
 "Digitization and Donation of Frank C. Craighead archives." Craighead Institute, n.d.
 "Digitizing the Ivan Doig Archive at Montana State University: a rise to the challenge illustrates creative tension." ScholarWorks: Montana State University, January, 2017. 
 "Montana State University begins processing Doig papers." Bozeman Daily Chronicle, November 28, 2015. 
 "Doig's Archives coming home to Montana." Last Best News, September 3, 2015.

External links 

 Digital Collections at Montana State University Archives and Special Collections.
 1972 Constitutional Convention Oral Histories.
 Norma Ashby interview with Dr. Burlingame, circa 1980s.
 Collection 2245 Merrill G. Burlingame Papers, 1880-1990.

Montana State University
Archives in the United States
History of Montana
Yellowstone National Park
Greater Yellowstone Ecosystem
Notable residents of Montana
Science and technology in Montana
Research institutes in Montana
Historians of Montana
History of Montana by period
Pre-statehood history of Montana
Historic sites in Montana
History of women in Montana
Montana pioneers
Native American history of Montana
Montana culture